Želeč may refer to:

 Želeč (Prostějov District), a village in the Czech Republic
 Želeč (Tábor District), a village in the Czech Republic